Pontikos (Greek: Ποντικός) is an island of the Echinades, among the Ionian Islands group of Greece. , it had no resident population.

References

External links
Pontikos on GTP Travel Pages (in English and Greek)

Echinades
Islands of the Ionian Islands (region)
Landforms of Ithaca
Islands of Greece